The Sincheon, a tributary of the Samicheon, is a stream in Gyeonggi-do, South Korea.  The Samicheon in turn flows into the Imjin River.

See also
Rivers of Korea
Geography of South Korea

Rivers of South Korea